Señorita Panamá 2017 the 51st Señorita Panamá pageant selecting delegates to Miss Universe and Miss World.  The 2017 pageant was split into two contests, Señorita Panamá Mundo and Señorita Panamá. It was the second edition of the renewed Señorita Panama pageant, after Justine Pasek, Miss Universe 2002, and César Anel Rodríguez be named the new directors of the pageant in Panamá. 20 preliminary contestants were selected from all over Panama and competed for the prestigious crown.

The event was held at the Atlapa Convention Centre, Ciudad de Panamá, Panama, August 25, 2017. Contestants from all over the country competed for the crown. Señorita Panamá 2016 Keity Drennan of Panama City crowned Laura de Sanctis of Contadora Island as her successor at the end of the event.

For the sixth consecutive time a competitor was named Señorita Panamá Mundo, who may not participate in the competition for Señorita Panamá Universe. Alessandra Bueno, Señorita Panamá World 2016, of Panama City crowned Julianne Brittón of Taboga Island as her successor at the end of the event.

Laura de Sanctis Señorita Panamá 2017 competed in Miss Universe 2017 on November 25, 2017.  Julianne Brittón, Señorita Panamá World,  represented Panama at the Miss World 2017 pageant held on December 2, 2017 at the Shenzhen Dayun Arena in Shenzhen, China; 'Erika Parker, Señorita Panamá  Earth, represented Panama at Miss Earth 2017; and Darelys Santos represented Panama at Miss International 2017 in Tokyo on November 14, 2017.

Final Result

Placements

Δ People's Choice

Special awards

National Costume Selection
This year the contestant, was celebrated in a private casting. It is a competition showing the country's wealth embodied in the colorful and fascinating costumes made by Panamenian designers combining the past and present of Panama. The winner costume represent Panamá in Miss Universe 2017 and the second place in Miss Earth 2017.

Preliminary Interview
Held on August 24, to Señorita Panamá candidates were qualified in personal interview.

Judges
Rossana Uribe: Stellar figure of the golden age of Miss Panama. (Panama)
César Mercado: Representative for Latin America at the New York Film Academy (Mexico)
Javier Gomez: Panamanian photographer based in New York. (Panama)
Sheldry Sáez: Miss Panamá 2011. (Panama)
José Gil: International Cultural Manager. (Chile)
George Wittels: Goldsmith International. (Austria / Venezuela)
Rafael Arrocha: Publicist. (Panama)
María Fernanda Robaina: Journalist. (Panama)
Aristides Burgos: Folklorist (Panama)
Alena Wohlwend: Cosmeatra. (Switzerland)
José Tejera: Doctor of Medicine. Psychiatrist. (Panama)

Señorita Panamá World 

The Señorita World Panamá pageant was held at the Atlapa Convention Centre, Ciudad de Panamá, Panama, on July 4, 2017. About 20 contestants from all over Panamá competed for the prestigious title. This year by decision of the international Miss World Organization, the election of the new global sovereign was held in a separate competition to the traditional national election. Alessandra Bueno Señorita Panamá Mundo 2016 crowned her successor as the new Señorita World Panamá.

Placements

Δ People's Choice

Special awards

Preliminary Interview
Held on July 2, to Señorita Panamá World candidates were qualified in personal interview.

Judges
 Lorelay de la Ossa de Vidal - Miss Panamá World 1979
 Melissa Piedrahita - Señorita Panamá World 2003
 Giselle Bissot - Señorita Panamá World 2006
 Gloria Stella Quintana - Señorita Panamá World 1989.
 Maria Jota Lovera - Businesswoman.
 Rogelio Campo - Businessman and owned of Frecuencias Asociadas.
 Massiel Rodriguez - Journalist and TV news presenter.
 Javier Zambrano - Industrial Engineer.
 Maylin Almeida - Director of Communications in Panama of Polytech.

Official Contestants 
These are the competitors who have been selected this year.

Historical significance
 Contadora win the Señorita Panamá title for first time.
 Colon win the Señorita Panamá Earth title for first time. 
 Taboga win the Señorita Panamá World title for first time. 
 Coclé, Los Santos, Colon place again in the final top after two year (2015)
 Panamá Oeste place for last time in (2014)
 Panamá Este place for last time in (2013)
 Chiriquí Occidente place for last time in (2009)
 Contadora, Flamenco, Panama Norte, Isla del Rey place for first time.

Election Schedule
Señorita Panamá World & Señorita Panamá 2017
Thursday May 31 presentation Show.
Thursday July 4 competition to select the Señorita Panamá World winner.
Thursday August 25 Final night, coronation Señorita Panamá  2017.

Candidates Notes
Margareth Villanueva & Laura Sofia De Sanctis participated in Señorita Panamá 2016 where both are 2nd runner-up and 1st runner-up respectively.
María Alejandra Tejada participated in the Miss Panamá 2013 representing Chiriquí.
Julianne Britton is the cousin of Keity Drennan (Señorita Panamá 2016).
Karol Dayana Batista competed in Miss Supranational 2017.

References

External links
Panamá 2017 official website
facebook page

Señorita Panamá
Panama
2017 in Panama